Hugo Zuckermann (15 May 1881, in Eger, Royal Bohemia – 23 December 1914, in Eger) was a Jewish-Austrian poet and Zionist.

Zuckermann was born in Cheb. In 1907 he founded, together with writer Oskar Rosenfeld, Egon Brecher and others a Jewish theatre group to play modern Yiddish dramas in the German language. The initiative lasted for one or two years. Later he became a lawyer in Meran. He fell early in the First World War after having written the very popular "Österreichisches Reiterlied". His work, published in one volume with an introduction by Otto Abeles in 1915, consists of poems including some translations from the Bible (Shir Hashirim, psalms). He also translated poems by Isaac Leib Peretz, Sholem Asch, Abraham Reisen, S. Schneir and other Yiddish authors.

Literature 
 Meier M. Reschke, Hugo Zuckermann: A Great Jewish Leader, Vantage Pr., 1985. 
 Hugo Zuckermann, Gedichte (edited by ), R. Löwit Verlag, Wien, 1915.

External links 
 
 Österreichisches Reiterlied (German text)
 Austrian Cavalry Song (translated by Margarete Münsterberg)

1881 births
1914 deaths
19th-century translators
19th-century male writers
Austrian male writers
Translators from Yiddish
Translators to German
Czech Zionists
Austrian Zionists
People from the Kingdom of Bohemia
Austrian people of Czech-Jewish descent
Austro-Hungarian Jews
People from Cheb
20th-century translators
Austro-Hungarian military personnel killed in World War I